Stegea hermalis is a moth in the family Crambidae. It was described by William Schaus in 1920. It is found from southern Mexico to Panama.

References

Moths described in 1920
Glaphyriinae